Sugardaddyforme.com is an online dating site for sugar daddies and sugar babies.

About Sugardaddyforme.com 
In 2013 the dating site had over 4 million members and over 2,000 new sugar daddy and sugar baby profiles every day. The website gets 1.5 million unique new visitors every month. The age range for women is predominantly 18-45 and for men the age range is predominantly 25-60.

SugarDaddyForMe.com was featured on The Montel Williams Show (2006) and The Tyra Banks Show. (2009). The website was covered in stories on Good Morning America, Fox News Channel, Current TV, CBS and KVEA (Telemundo 52).

Publicly known members include businessman Geoffrey Edelsten, David Simon, and Danny Kedem, Anthony Weiner’s mayoral campaign chief.

References

External links
 

Online dating for specific interests
Online dating services of the United States